Chandi Sona is a 1977 Indian Hindi-language film. Produced and directed by Sanjay Khan the film stars Sanjay Khan, Parveen Babi, Premnath, Pran, Ranjeet, Danny Denzongpa, Asrani, Paintal, Kamini Kaushal, Iftekhar and Raj Kapoor (in a special appearance). The film's music is by R. D. Burman

Plot
A group of people of Indian origin live on an island which contains a tomb of Shahenshah Chandi Sona which is believed to contain jewelry, diamonds and gold. Mayur and Rita, stage actor love-birds, plot with Amar to steal this wealth and better their lives. They decide to buy a house from a woman named Mayadevi, and after doing so they decide to make a swimming pool and through that dig a tunnel right underneath the tomb and help themselves to the riches that they find there. They also decide to enlist the help of four jailbirds by dramatically helping them to escape from prison. After the completion of the tunnel, they run into an underground pool of water and enlist the help of undersea divers Bikram and Sharma. What this group does not know is that there is an ancient creature that is lying in wait for food; that Mayadevi is not who she claims to be, and she has an ulterior motive for herself.

Cast
Sanjay Khan
Parveen Babi
Pran
Premnath
Ranjeet
Danny Denzongpa
Asrani
Paintal
Kamini Kaushal
Iftekhar
Raj Kapoor

Soundtrack

External links 
 

Films scored by R. D. Burman
Films shot in Mauritius
1977 films
1970s Hindi-language films
Indian adventure films
1970s adventure films
Hindi-language adventure films